This is a list of television serial dramas released by TVB in 2012.

Top ten drama series in ratings

The following is a list of the highest-rated drama series released by TVB in 2012. The list includes premiere week, final week ratings, series finale ratings, as well as the average overall count of live Hong Kong viewers (in millions).

Awards

First line-up
These dramas air in Hong Kong from 8:00pm to 8:30pm, Monday to Friday on Jade.

Second line-up
These dramas air in Hong Kong from 8:30pm to 9:30pm, Monday to Friday on Jade.

Third line-up
These dramas air in Hong Kong from 9:30pm to 10:30pm, Monday to Friday on Jade.

Weekend dramas
These dramas air in Hong Kong every Sunday nights from 10:00pm to 11:30pm on Jade.

Warehoused dramas
These dramas were first premiered overseas before an official release on the local TVB Jade Channel.

References

External links
  TVB.com

2012
2012 in Hong Kong television